Tag der Freiheit: Unsere Wehrmacht (Day of Freedom: Our Armed Forces) is the third documentary directed by Leni Riefenstahl, following Victory of Faith and Triumph of the Will. Her third film recounts the Seventh Party Rally of the Nazi Party, which occurred in Nuremberg in 1935, and focuses on the German army.

Tag der Freiheit was considered lost at the end of World War II, but an incomplete print of the film was discovered in the 1970s—the extant footage reveals Riefenstahl mainly reprising the approach she used in Triumph of the Will (1934), though certain more expressionistic sequences clearly presage the more audacious style she would adopt for Olympia (1938).

Synopsis
The film depicts a mock battle staged by German troops during the ceremonies at Nuremberg on German Armed Forces Day 1935. The camera follows the soldiers from their early-morning preparations in their tent city as they march singing to the vast parade grounds where a miniature war involving infantry, cavalry, aircraft, flak guns and the first public appearance of Germany's new forbidden tank is presented before Hitler and thousands of spectators.

The film ends with a montage of Nazi flags to the tune of the "Deutschlandlied" and a shot of German fighter biplanes flying overhead in a swastika formation.

Background
When several generals in the Wehrmacht protested over the minimal army presence in Triumph of the Will, Hitler proposed his own "artistic" compromise where Triumph would open with a camera slowly tracking down a row of all the "overlooked" generals (and placate each general's ego). According to her own testimony, Riefenstahl boldly refused his suggestion and insisted on keeping artistic control over Triumph of the Will. She did agree to return to the 1935 rally and make a film exclusively about the Wehrmacht, which became Tag der Freiheit.

References

External links
 
 
 
 English translation of Hitler's speech in the film 

1935 documentary films
1935 films
German black-and-white films
Films directed by Leni Riefenstahl
Films of Nazi Germany
Nuremberg Rally films
Films about Adolf Hitler
1930s rediscovered films
German documentary films
Rediscovered German films
1930s German films